
Gmina Lipinki Łużyckie is a rural gmina (administrative district) in Żary County, Lubusz Voivodeship, in western Poland.

Villages
Gmina Lipinki Łużyckie contains the villages and settlements of Boruszyn, Brzostowa, Cisowa, Górka, Grotów, Lipinki Łużyckie, Pietrzyków, Piotrowice, Sieciejów, Suchleb, Tyliczki and Zajączek.

Neighbouring gminas
Gmina Lipinki Łużyckie is bordered by the gminas of Jasień, Przewóz, Trzebiel, Tuplice and Żary.

References

Lipinki Luzyckie
Żary County